Thomas Philip de Grey, 2nd Earl de Grey, 3rd Baron Grantham, 6th Baron Lucas, KG, PC, FRS (born Robinson, later Weddell; 8 December 178114 November 1859), styled as The Hon. Thomas Robinson until 1786 and as Lord Grantham from 1786 to 1833, of Wrest Park in the parish of Silsoe, Bedfordshire, was a British Tory statesman. He changed his surname to Weddell in 1803 and to de Grey in 1833.

Origins

He was the eldest son of Thomas Robinson, 2nd Baron Grantham (1738–1786) of Newby Hall, Newby-on-Swale, a deserted medieval village and of adjacent Rainton, both in the parish of Topcliffe in Yorkshire, by his wife Mary Yorke (1757–1830), the younger daughter of Philip Yorke, 2nd Earl of Hardwicke by his wife Jemima Campbell, suo jure 2nd Marchioness Grey. His younger brother was the Prime Minister Frederick John Robinson, 1st Earl of Ripon, 1st Viscount Goderich, known to history as "Lord Goderich".

Inheritance
In 1786 he succeeded his father as 3rd Baron Grantham. In 1792 he became the heir of his distant cousin William Weddell (1736–1792) of Newby Hall in Yorkshire, a notable art collector. Also in 1792 he became the 6th Robinson Baronet "of Newby", succeeding his father's first cousin Norton Robinson, 5th Baronet (died 1792). In 1833 he succeeded his maternal aunt Amabel Hume-Campbell, suo jure 1st Countess de Grey and 5th Baroness Lucas (1750–1833), as 2nd Earl de Grey (according to a special remainder) and as 6th Baron Lucas, of Crudwell. He also inherited her estate of Wrest Park in Silsoe, Bedfordshire.

Career
In 1798 he was admitted to St John's College, Cambridge, graduating MA in 1801. He was made Privy Counsellor in December 1834 while holding office as First Lord of the Admiralty till April 1835, and a Knight of the Garter in 1844. He was colonel-commandant of the Yorkshire Hussars, a part-time Yeomanry Cavalry regiment, for over forty years and was appointed yeomanry aide-de-camp to William IV and held similar position under Queen Victoria. Lord Grantham was nominated as Lord Lieutenant of Bedfordshire in 1818, an office which he held until his death. He served as Lord Lieutenant of Ireland from September 1841 to July 1844. During his time in Ireland he disagreed with Peel's religious conciliation of Ireland, claiming that economic conciliation was a greater priority. He called for more legislation focused on Ireland whilst Peel pursued economic legislation aimed at benefitting the UK as a whole. Charles Read has argued that De Grey was also the key figure who politically defeated the Irish nationalist Repeal movement without any bloodshed, a rare achievement in an era that featured the very bloody Peterloo massacre and the 1848 Revolutions in Europe.

Other public positions
On the founding of the Institute of British Architects in London in 1834 he was invited to become its first president remaining so till his death in 1859. The institute received its Royal Charter in 1837 becoming Royal Institute of British Architects in London; he was also the first president of the Royal Architectural Museum. Earl de Grey was also a fellow of the Royal Society from 1841, a fellow of the Society of Antiquaries, and served as one of the New Buckingham Palace Commissioners from 1848. He remodeled his London townhouse at No.4 St James's Square (now the Naval & Military Club) and between February 1833 and October 1839 rebuilt Wrest Park, his seat in Bedfordshire, in the French style, assisted by James Clephan. He redesigned the deer park and added decoration and several statues.

Marriage and children
In 1805 he married Lady Henrietta Cole, a daughter of William Cole, 1st Earl of Enniskillen, by whom he had two daughters and co-heiresses:
Ann Florence de Grey (Countess Cowper), eldest daughter and co-heiress, who married George Cowper, 6th Earl Cowper. She was suo jure Baroness Lucas, having inherited that title from her father.
Mary Gertrude de Grey, younger daughter and co-heiress.

Death and succession
Lord de Grey died in November 1859, aged 77, having survived his wife by eleven years. He was succeeded in the Barony of Lucas of Crudwell by his daughter, Ann de Grey (Countess Cowper), who married George Cowper, 6th Earl Cowper. His other titles, unable to pass via a female line, passed to his heir male, namely his nephew, George Robinson, 1st Marquess of Ripon, 2nd Earl of Ripon.

References 

 The Earl de Grey's account of the building of Wrest House, History of Wrest House, introduction by A. F. Cirket, The Bedfordshire Historical Record Society, Volume 59, pp 65–87, Bedford 1980
 Earl de Grey, Charles Read, London 2007

External links 

 Thomas Philip de Grey, 2nd Earl de Grey | National Portrait Gallery
 Thomas Philip de Grey | National Trust Art

1781 births
1859 deaths
Alumni of St John's College, Cambridge
Earls in the Peerage of the United Kingdom
Knights of the Garter
Lord-Lieutenants of Bedfordshire
Lords Lieutenant of Ireland
Lords of the Admiralty
Members of the Privy Council of the United Kingdom
Fellows of the Royal Society
Presidents of the Royal Institute of British Architects
Yorkshire Hussars officers
Thomas
Barons Lucas